The Argentine Masters or Torneo de Maestros was one of the most prestigious golf tournaments in Argentina, despite not having been played continuously since the inaugural event in 1961. It was always held at the Olivos Golf Club near Buenos Aires.

The tournament formed part of the Tour de las Americas schedule. In 2008 it was co-sanctioned by the Canadian Tour (2009 season).

The most successful players have been the superstars of Argentine golf, Roberto De Vicenzo with five victories, and Ángel Cabrera with four wins in the five events held between 1999 and 2007.

Winners

References

External links
Olivos Golf Club - official site
Tour de las Americas - official site

Golf tournaments in Argentina
Tour de las Américas events
Recurring sporting events established in 1961
Recurring sporting events disestablished in 2011
Defunct sports competitions in Argentina